Lucille Mulhall (October 21, 1885 – December 21, 1940) was a well-known cowgirl and Wild West performer.

She was born in St. Louis, Missouri to Zach and Agnes Mulhall. Her parents brought her to the Oklahoma Territory in 1889. She was raised on her family's Mulhall Ranch in Oklahoma Territory, near what is now Mulhall, Oklahoma.

Known as one of the first women to compete with men in roping and riding events, she was called Rodeo Queen, Queen of the Western Prairie, and Queen of the Saddle (among many other appellations). She starred in the Miller Brothers' 101 Ranch Wild West Show, formed her own troupe in 1913 and performed in many rodeo and Wild West shows throughout her career. She produced her own rodeo in 1916. She retired to her family's ranch in Mulhall around 1922.

She was inducted into the National Cowboy and Western Heritage Museum into their Rodeo Hall of Fame in 1975, and into the National Cowgirl Museum and Hall of Fame in 1977.

Mulhall died in Logan County, Oklahoma, in an automobile accident less than a mile from the Mulhall Ranch.

References

External links

Cowgirl Hall of Fame entry on Lucy Mulhall

1885 births
1940 deaths
People from Logan County, Oklahoma
Wild West show performers
Cowboys
Roping (rodeo)
Saddle bronc riders
Bareback bronc riders
Cowgirl Hall of Fame inductees